CCTV-5+, formerly CCTV-HD, is China Central Television's channel designated to broadcast top international sporting events in high-definition. It was tested in Beijing on 1 January 2008, and launched officially on 30 June 2008 under CCTV-HD. CCTV-HD was created specifically for the 2008 Summer Olympics and 2008 Summer Paralympics.

Due to there having been several more HD CCTV broadcast channels in China, CCTV changed the channel name to "CCTV-5+ Sports Plus" on 18 August 2013. It's the second sports channel of the CCTV network.

This channel was previously only available for selected cable/satellite providers, but is now widely available.

References

External links 
  

China Central Television channels
Television channels and stations established in 2008
2008 establishments in China